Sir James Woods KBE (1855 – April 25, 1941) was a Canadian industrialist and philanthropist who was knighted in 1915 for wartime industrial work and named 
knight commander of the Order of the British Empire in 1917 for his work as a member of the British War Commission in New York.

In 1928, he was vice-president of Imperial Bank of Canada.

He was president of York Knitting Mills Ltd. and of Gordon Mackay and Company Ltd., a wholesale dry goods company. Archives of Gordon Mackay are held by Trent University in Peterborough, Ontario.

In 1930, he proposed a merger of knitting mill companies including Zimmerknit and Gordon Mackay.

Philanthropy
In 1912, he founded St. Christopher House, a settlement house in Toronto now known as West Community House. Later, he was vice-chairman of the Health League of Canada.

Activism
He helped establish the "Forty to Fifty Club", which was intended to help men in this age group find appropriate work.

In 1938, he published a pamphlet titled Insurance of Employment.

Personal life

Woods married Euphemia Douglas on 8 June 1880. Their son, Captain John Robinson Woods, was killed in action on 24 October 1917 during the Third Battle of Ypres, also known as Passchendaele. Another son, Captain William Blakeney Woods, also served.

References

1855 births
1941 deaths
Canadian chief executives
People from Woodstock, Ontario
Canadian Knights Commander of the Order of the British Empire